Julie Anne Stewart (born 1967) is a Canadian stage, film, television and voice actress, and director. She is most commonly known for her role as Sgt. Ali McCormick from the CTV television series Cold Squad.

Life
Stewart was born in Kingston, Ontario, Canada, and studied acting at the National Theatre School of Canada in Montreal, Quebec.  She is married to music and sound producer Jamie Stanley (Umbrella Sound) and makes her home in Shelburne, Nova Scotia.

Stewart is an avid sailor and Albacore competitive racer. Her experience as a sailing racer was documented in the 2019 film We Are Sailor People.

Career
Julie Stewart's first professional acting job was at the Thousand Islands Playhouse in 1983, in Arms and the Man. She made her television debut in the CBC miniseries Chasing Rainbows as Paula Ashley. Recurring roles include North of 60 as Rosemary Fletcher; The Border as Terri Knight-Kessler. Film roles include Florence in Snow Cake (2006), and Ruth in Still Mine (2012).

In addition to her lead role in Cold Squad, Stewart also directed episodes "The Nanny" (season 5), "Back in the Day" (season 6), and "Mr. Bad Example" (season 7).

Stage credits include productions at the Shaw Festival (Trelawny of the "Wells", Man and Superman, Ubu Rex), The Miracle Worker (1992, Manitoba Theatre Centre), Pygmalion (1993, Globe Theatre), District of Centuries (1995, Factory Theatre), Poor Super Man (1995, Canadian Stage Company), Rune Arlidge (2004, Tarragon Theatre), The Little Years (2006, Neptune Theatre), Goodnight Desdemona (Good Morning Juliet) (2008, Regent Theatre), True Love Lies (2009, Factory Theatre), And Up They Flew (2009, Theatre Columbus), The Blonde, the Brunette and the Vengeful Redhead (2009, Thousand Islands Playhouse), All That Fall (2010, Theatre Columbus), Dead Metaphor (2014, Canadian Rep Theatre), Age of Arousal (2015, Factory Theatre).

Stewart received eight Gemini Awards nominations, winning "Best Performance by an Actress in a Continuing Leading Dramatic Role" in 2002 for her performance as Sgt. Ali McCormick in Cold Squad. For the same role she received a Leo Award nomination for "Best Lead Performance By A Female in a Dramatic Series" in 2002 and won the award in 2003.

Filmography

Film

Television

Director

Awards and nominations

References

Further reading
 
  (Published originally in the Toronto Sun on September 4, 2004.)
 
 
  (via National Dream Productions)
 </ref>
 
 
  (geo-blocked)
 
 

Books

External links 
 
  Julie Stewart on Vimeo
  Julie Stewart – VO (Commercial) Voicebank.net demo
  Julie Stewart – VO (Narration) Voicebank.net demo
  Julie Stewart at NorthernStars

1967 births
Living people
20th-century Canadian actresses
21st-century Canadian actresses
Canadian film actresses
Canadian stage actresses
Canadian television actresses
Canadian television directors
Canadian women television directors
Actresses from Kingston, Ontario
Best Actress in a Drama Series Canadian Screen Award winners